Arilova is a residential area of Visakhapatnam, Andhra Pradesh, India. It is located on the north fringe of Visakhapatnam city with hills surrounding on opposite sides.  It is located beside Kailasagiri.  Arilova is a Part of GVMC Greater Visakhapatnam Municipal Corporation, which is responsible for the civic amenities in Arilova.

Head Office: Visakhapatnam H.O
Sub Office: Govt Dairy Farm S.O
Location: Visakhapatnam (Urban) Taluk of Visakhapatnam

District

Arilova is mainly a middle-class hub. Arilova comes under Visakhapatnam- East Constituency. Arilova plays an important role in every aspect of Visakhapatnam. It is also known as the Health City of Visakhapatnam as many hospitals are being built in and around Arilova.

Localities
Kailasnagar and Sri Hari Nagar, Arilova Colony, Durganagar, TIC Point, Ambedkar Nagar, Parvathi Nagar, Apsara Colony, Mustafa Colony, Balaji Nagar, and Thotagaruvu are important residential areas in Arilova. The East Point golf club was also located in Arilova. Mudasarlova Reservoir is Located near this place. Hanumanthuwaka, Kailasagiri, M.V.P, Venkojipalem are places located around Visakhapatnam.

Hospitals
The nearest major hospitals are the Visakha Institute of Medical Science, L.V. Prasad Eye Hospital, Apollo hospital, Care Hospital, Gims Hospital, Pinnacle hospitals, M.B Hospital, and diabetics hospitals. Arilova is also known as the Health City of Visakhapatnam.

Transport
Arilova is well connected to most locations of the city by the state-owned bus service, APSRTC. Arilova as Bus Rapid Transit System Roads. Any part of Vizag can be reached in just a few minutes. Arilova is directly connected to Visakhapatnam Railway Station, Dwaraka Nagar, Jagadamba Centre, MVP Colony, Asilmetta and Simhachalam. Arilova BRTS is a crucial part of the circuit in the city. Bus routes from Arilova: 69-Railway station, 60c-Jagadamba, 60b-RK Beach, 400-Gajuwaka & 500-Anakapalli.
APSRTC routes

References

Neighbourhoods in Visakhapatnam
Towns in Visakhapatnam district